World Surfing Reserves (WSR) is a program launched in 2009 by the non-governmental organization Save the Waves Coalition aimed at protecting global surf habitats. The program proactively identifies, designates and enshrines international waves, surf zones and surrounding environments, protecting them from the threat of development.

History

The idea to protect surf spots originally came from to one of the cofounders of the program, the National Surfing Reserves (NSR) in Australia. After four years of naming surf spots in Australia, NSR partnered with the NGO Save the Waves Coalition and launched the World Surfing Reserves to go international with their protection program. Professional big-wave surfer Joao de Macedo is also a co-founder of the program. It was officially launched at the Value of Waves Roundtable held in Half Moon Bay, California.

Locations

There are currently nine surfing reserves across the world. World Surfing Reserves are nominated through a selection process and there are currently dozens of proposed WSRs covering nearly every continent on the planet. The dates indicated the commencement of the commitment by the local and international communities to protect and preserve Malibu as an iconic surf site. 

Since 2019, the North Devon region is being surveyed to have multiple of its beaches included in the list of reserves.

Mission 
The mission of the World Surfing Reserves (WSR) program is to gain international recognition and support for wave and coastal protection around the world by creating a global network of designated surfing reserves. WSR also recognizes environmental, social, cultural and economic benefits of waves. WSR was created in conjunction with National Surfing Reserves Australia, and has established partnerships with the International Surfing Association (ISA), and Stanford University's Center for Responsible Travel (CREST). WSR is also affiliated with the Surf Conservation Partnership led by Conservation International.

In August 2009, WSR called for nominations from all national surfing federations. More than 150 sites were nominated from 34 countries. WSR eventually plans to induct 30-40 surf breaks around the world. The program has gained a substantial amount of positive feedback and support from the sport's leaders, including Kelly Slater.

Council and committee
World Surfing Reserves is led by an international executive committee and vision council. It is the responsibility of these groups to govern the program and make the final wave selections. For a specific surf site to enter WSR, the region must have exceptional and consistent surf, along with a rich history and culture of surfing, as well as strong community support.

Vision Council

Fernando Aguerre, Will Henry, Jim Moriarty, Tony Butt, Terry Gibson, Len Materman, Miles Walsh, Wallace J. Nichols, Steve Hawk, Wayne “Rabbit” Bartholomew, Tiago Pires, Greg Long, Mark Massara, Chris LaFrankie, Chad Nelsen, Neil Lazarow, Brad Farmer, Manolo Lozano, Juca De Barros, Drew Kampion, Professor Andy Short, Professor Ben Finney.

Executive Committee

Professor Andy Short, Brad Farmer, Drew Kampion, Will Henry, Dean LaTourrette.

Google Earth Plug-In
Save the Waves Coalition also created a Google Earth WSR plug-in that allows organizations and individuals to view nominated sites around the world. The plug-in allows users to learn about a nominated wave's history, location, environmental characteristics and surf culture.

See also
Huanchaco
Trujillo
Malibu Lagoon State Beach

References

Further reading 
Vanessa Ratten, Social innovation in sport: the creation of Santa Cruz as a world surfing reserve, International Journal of Innovation Science, 26 March 2019 (ISSN 1757-2223)

External links 
Official website
World Surfing Reserves Manifesto
Save the Waves Coalition home page

Organizations established in 2008
Environmental organizations based in the United States
International environmental organizations
Surfing organizations